Nicholas Davis Jr. (January 14, 1825 – November 3, 1875) was an American politician who served as a Deputy from Alabama to the Provisional Congress of the Confederate States from April 1861 to February 1862.

Biography
Nicholas Davis Jr. was born in Limestone County, Alabama, and served in the legislature in 1851. He was elected to the Provisional Congress of the Confederate States to replace David P. Lewis and served in that capacity from April 1861 to February 1862.

He was unsuccessful in organizing his own regiment during the American Civil War and served as lieutenant colonel of the 19th Regiment Alabama Infantry instead.

References

External links

 
 Nicholas Davis Jr. at The Political Graveyard

1825 births
1875 deaths
19th-century American politicians
Alabama Secession Delegates of 1861
Deputies and delegates to the Provisional Congress of the Confederate States
Members of the Alabama House of Representatives
Members of the Confederate House of Representatives from Alabama